Khattar Kaka'k Tarang is a collection of short stories written by Professor Hari Mohan Jha. These stories were originally published in a Maithili periodical called Mithila Mihir. Later, the stories were compiled into a book and published as Khattar Kaka'k Tarang.The stories are considered as the best among Hari Mohan Jha's books.

Social Impact
The stories published in this book caused hue and cry from various section of people of the Mithila region. The stories are basically satires on the ignorance of people about the actual principles of religion, religious texts and religious practices. The stories were written when the Brahmin domination was damaging the local culture of Mithila. Still, they were quite popular in the 1980s, when they were added into the matriculation syllabus of the Bihar School Examination Board. These were equally enjoyed as the short stories of Gunu Jha, the mithila's reply to the Birbal & Tenalirama.

Indian short stories
Culture of Mithila
Books on Mithila Region
Maithili-language books